Gerald Bernard Odrowski (born October 4, 1938) is a Canadian former professional ice hockey defenceman who played 309 games in the National Hockey League and another 282 in the World Hockey Association. He played for the NHL's Detroit Red Wings, Oakland Seals and St. Louis Blues as well as the WHA's Los Angeles Sharks, Phoenix Roadrunners, Minnesota Fighting Saints and the Winnipeg Jets.

Career statistics

Regular season and playoffs

References

External links
 

1938 births
Living people
Canadian expatriate ice hockey players in the United States
Canadian ice hockey defencemen
Detroit Red Wings players
Ice hockey people from Ontario
Los Angeles Sharks players
Minnesota Fighting Saints players
Oakland Seals players
People from Parry Sound District
Phoenix Roadrunners (WHA) players
Phoenix Roadrunners (WHL) players
Pittsburgh Hornets players
Quebec Aces (AHL) players
San Francisco Seals (ice hockey) players
Sault Ste. Marie Greyhounds players
St. Louis Blues players
Sudbury Wolves (EPHL) players
Toronto St. Michael's Majors players
Vancouver Canucks (WHL) players
Winnipeg Jets (WHA) players